Hot Country Songs is a chart that ranks the top-performing country music songs in the United States, published by Billboard magazine.  In 1962, 11 different singles topped the chart in 52 issues of the magazine, based on playlists submitted by country music radio stations and sales reports submitted by stores.  The chart was published under the title Hot C&W Sides through the October 27 issue and Hot Country Singles thereafter, a title it would retain until 1990.

In the issue of Billboard dated January 6, the number one song was "Walk On By" by Leroy Van Dyke, in its eleventh week in the top spot.  The single remained atop the chart through the issue dated March 3 for a final total of nineteen weeks at number one.  This figure set a record for the most weeks at number one on the Hot Country chart which would stand for more than 50 years until Florida Georgia Line spent 24 weeks at number one between December 2012 and August 2013 with the song "Cruise".  Claude King tied Van Dyke for the most weeks spent at number one in the calendar year of 1962, with an unbroken run of nine weeks in the peak position with the song "Wolverton Mountain".  Marty Robbins had an eight-week run at the top with "Devil Woman".

In 1962, Sheb Wooley reached number one with his first country chart entry, "That's My Pa", which spent one week in the top spot in March.  Wooley had achieved success on the pop charts in 1958 with the million-selling novelty song "The Purple People Eater", but had never previously appeared on the country listing.  In April, Billy Walker achieved the only chart-topper of his career with "Charlie's Shoes", and in June Claude King similarly topped the chart for the only time with "Wolverton Mountain".   Both acts would continue to chart regularly well into the 1970s but would never repeat the success of their 1962 singles.   In the issue of Billboard dated October 27, Bill Anderson reached the top spot for the first time with "Mama Sang a Song", and two weeks later Hank Snow achieved his first Hot Country number one with "I've Been Everywhere".  Snow had gained several chart-toppers in the early 1950s when Billboard published multiple country music charts which tracked sales, jukebox plays and radio airplay separately, but "I've Been Everywhere" was his first number one since the magazine launched an overall listing in 1958.  He would not top the chart again until 1974.  The final number one of the year was "Don't Let Me Cross Over" by husband-and-wife duo Carl Butler and Pearl, another first-time chart-topper.

Chart history

See also
1962 in music
1962 in country music
List of artists who reached number one on the U.S. country chart

References

1962
Country
1962 record charts